Yengi Kandi (also Romanized as Yengī Kandī; also known as Nīgī Kand and Yengī Kand) is a village in Garmeh-ye Jonubi Rural District, in the Central District of Meyaneh County, East Azerbaijan Province, Iran. At the 2006 census, its population was 62, in 14 families.

References 

Populated places in Meyaneh County